The Araucanian herring (Strangomera bentincki or Clupea bentincki) is a fish species in the family Clupeidae. It is an epipelagic fish, silvery below and dark blue above, which schools in coastal waters off the west coast of South America. It ranges along the Chilean coast from Valparaiso south to Talcahuano. It schools at depths from 0 to 70 meters in nearshore areas.

There it filter feeds on smaller plankton such as diatoms. It reaches sexual maturity when it is about 10 centimetres long, and is a pelagic spawner, spawning between June and November. It grows to a maximum standard length of 15 cm.

Fisheries
The Araucanian herring is a commercial species, largely used for fishmeal. Based on the FAO fishery statistics, it was the 12th most important capture fish species in 2009. All reported landings are from Chile.

References

Literature
 
 
 Whitehead PJP, Nelson GJ and Wongratana T (1988) FAO species catalogue, volume 7: Clupeoid Fishes of the World (Suborder Clupeoidei) FAO Fisheries Synopsis 125, Rome. . Download pdf Page 130–131.

Araucanian herring
Western South American coastal fauna
Commercial fish
Araucanian herring
Taxa named by John Roxborough Norman
Endemic fauna of Chile
Fauna of Temperate South America